The West Kent Invitation Tournament was a professional golf tournament held on 10 October 1925 at West Kent Golf Club near Bickley, Kent, England. It was 36-hole stroke play invitation event with a total of £200 in prize money. 18 professionals competed, including most of the leading British golfers.

Ted Ray won the tournament with rounds of 72 and 71, three ahead of Arthur Havers. Abe Mitchell was third, a further shot behind, with Fred Robson fourth and George Gadd fifth. Mitchell was challenging Ray, his playing partner, after reaching the turn in 34. However he took 40 for the last 9 holes to Ray's 36.

Winners

References

Golf tournaments in England